Erythrina coralloides (flame coral tree, naked coral tree) is a species of flowering tree in the pea family, Fabaceae, that is native to eastern Mexico. It ranges from Tamaulipas south to Oaxaca, and some taxonomists believe it is also native to southern Arizona in the United States.

Description
Erythrina coralloides is a tree reaching a height of 12 m. Its seeds are elliptic, smooth, glossy, coral-red, with a salient longitudinal line on the back, and with a white hilum surrounded by a black border.

Uses
Its white wood is used for making bungs and, especially in San Luis Potosí, figurines.  The clusters of red and white flowers on the Naked Coral Tree make it an attractive ornamental. The flowers are also used as a food source.

Phytochemistry
The seeds are very poisonous, containing erythroidine, a powerful muscle relaxant; erythroresin, an emetic; coralin; and erythric acid. The extract has been suggested as a substitute for curare. An analysis by Rio de la Loza showed the seeds contain 13.35 solid and liquid fat, 0.32 resin soluble in ether, 13.47 resin soluble in alcohol, 1.61 erythrococalloidine, an alkaloid, 5.60 albumen, 0.83 gum, 1.55 sugar, 0.42 organic acid, 15.87 starch, 7.15 moisture and 39.15 inorganic matter.

References

External links
Erythrina coralloides photos
International Legume Database & Information Service: Erythrina coralloides

coralloides
Endemic flora of Mexico
Trees of Mexico
Trees of Guanajuato
Trees of Hidalgo (state)
Flora of the State of Mexico
Trees of Nuevo León
Trees of Oaxaca
Trees of Puebla
Trees of San Luis Potosí
Trees of Veracruz
Plants described in 1825
Taxa named by Augustin Pyramus de Candolle
Garden plants of North America
Ornamental trees